The 2017 NRLB Championship, is the second semi-professional season of Dutch Rugby League Competition. Four teams compete over 6 rounds, after which the two highest enter the Grand Final. The two lowest teams then enter the third-place play-off.

2017 NRLB Championship features four teams, the first year in which this number has taken part, after the foundation of Harderwijk Dolphins in the summer of 2016. This is also the second year since the Netherlands hosted its own domestic competition, following the separation from Belgium.

2017 Competition

Rotterdam Nines

The annual NRLB nines competition returns in 2017, and will be hosted by the Rotterdamse Studenten Rugby Club, in Rotterdam.

Teams

Ladder

League Schedule

Round 1

Round 2

Round 3

Round 4

Round 5

Round 6

Finals

Third-Place Play Off

Grand Final

Great British Royal Air Force Tour

Game 1

Game 2

Game 3

References

External links

Rugby league in the Netherlands
2017 in rugby league